Mawalkot is a village in Ramban Tehsil of Ramban district in the Indian union territory of Jammu and Kashmir. It has a population of 1289 of which 673 are male and 616 are females.

References

Villages in Ramban district